The Model Husband is a 1959 Swiss comedy film directed by Karl Suter and starring Walter Roderer, Silvia Frank and Hannes Schmidhauser. It is a remake of the 1937 film The Model Husband, which was itself based a 1915 play Fair and Warmer by Avery Hopwood. Another version The Model Husband had been made in West Germany in 1956.

Cast 
 Walter Roderer as Willy Guggenbühl
 Silvia Frank as Yvonne Leuenberger
 Hannes Schmidhauser as Edi
 Olga Gebhard as Margrit Guggenbühl
 Richard Alexander as Roger Nyffeler
 Giovanna D'Argenzio as Antonella
 Max Haufler as Möbelträger
 Michael Mike as Kbi
 Ernst Stiefel as Jack

References

Bibliography

External links 
 

1959 films
Swiss comedy films
1959 comedy films
Swiss German-language films
Remakes of German films
Films directed by Karl Suter